Christer-André Cederberg (born 22 May 1979) is a Norwegian mixer, music producer and the owner of Cederberg Studios. He has produced and/or mixed the music of several of the biggest artists in Norway, such as Sondre Justad, Eva & The Heartmaker, Maria Mena, Bjørn Eidsvåg, Honningbarna, Gåte. He has also produced and/or mixed artists from the UK, Australia, Germany, USA, Japan, Canada, Poland, Israel, Holland and more.

Early years 
Christer started his musical career as a guitarist and songwriter, signing his first record deal at the age of 17. During the late 1990s he worked as a session musician, recording numerous albums. This is what sparked his fascination for music production and lead him to becoming a full-time producer and engineer by 2001.

Christer played guitar in the band Animal Alpha in the period 2002 - 2009. The band recorded two studio albums, appeared at a lot of big festivals, toured throughout Europe and played in the USA. They were nominated for Spellemansprisen (the Norwegian Grammy) multiple times and had several songs featured in movies and video games.

Discography
Animal Alpha
Animal Alpha EP (2005)
Pheromones (2005)
Bundy (2005)
Most Wanted Cowboy (2006)
You Pay For The Whole Seat, But You'll Only Need The Edge (2008)
Stille Opprør
Prosjekt 2-13 (2001)
S.o2 (2008)
In the Woods...
Strange in Stereo (1999)
Epitaph (2000)
Three times seven on a pilgrimage(2000)
Live at Caledonian hall (2002)
Tristania
Darkest White (2013)
Anathema
Weather Systems (2012)
Universal (2013)
Distant Satellites (2014)

References

External links
Official homepage
http://www.discogs.com/artist/Christer+Andr%C3%A9+Cederberg

1979 births
Living people
Norwegian record producers
Norwegian audio engineers
Norwegian musicians